Arnica acaulis is a North American species of plants in the sunflower family, known by the common name common leopardbane. It is native to the southeastern and east-central parts of the United States, from Alabama and Florida north to New Jersey and Pennsylvania.

References

External links
Lady Bird Johnson Wildflower Center, University of Texas
Alabama Plants
Digital Atlas of the Virginia Flora

acaulis
Flora of the Eastern United States
Plants described in 1788